Ángelo Roso Neto (born 5 July 1960) is a Brazilian rower. He competed at the 1984 Summer Olympics and the 1988 Summer Olympics.

References

External links
 

1960 births
Living people
Brazilian male rowers
Olympic rowers of Brazil
Rowers at the 1984 Summer Olympics
Rowers at the 1988 Summer Olympics
Rowers from Rio de Janeiro (city)
Pan American Games medalists in rowing
Pan American Games silver medalists for Brazil
Rowers at the 1987 Pan American Games